The River  Feale (An Fhéil or Abhainn na Féile in Irish) rises near Rockchapel in the Mullaghareirk Mountains of County Cork in the southwest of Ireland and flows northwestwards for 75 kilometres  through Abbeyfeale in County Limerick and Listowel in County Kerry before finally emptying into Cashen Bay, a wide estuary north of Ballyduff. Then it flows out through the Shannon's estuary and joins with the Atlantic Ocean with a flow rate of 34.6 m2/s. The river, along with its tributaries, combine to add to over 160 km (100 miles) of waterways. For the final 10 km (6 miles) stretch it is known as the Cashen River. The river contains a large salmon and sea trout population.

The headwaters of the Feale rise approximately 4.3 km northeast of the village of Rockchapel between the townlands of Rockhill West, Rockhill East and Tooreenmacauliffe on the southwestern slopes of Mullaghareirk mountain.

Name
According to Geoffrey Keating's Foras Feasa ar Éirinn (compiled in the 1630s), the river takes its name from a legendary woman:
In Co Limerick and north Co Kerry the Feale is also referred to as one of the Three Sisters. These are three rivers which all rise close to each other in the Mullaghareirk mountains in north Co Cork and generally flow north or northwest into the Shannon Estuary. The other two rivers being the Maigue and Deel. This term is not to be confused with three of Ireland's larger rivers, the Nore the Suir and the Barrow, which are also collectively referred to as The Three Sisters.

See also
 Rivers of Ireland
 Shannon River Basin

References

Rivers of County Kerry
Rivers of County Cork